The men's foil was one of eight fencing events on the fencing at the 1960 Summer Olympics programme. It was the thirteenth appearance of the event. The competition was held from 29 – 30 August 1960. 78 fencers from 31 nations competed. Nations had been limited to three fencers each since 1928. The event was won by Viktor Zhdanovich of the Soviet Union, with his countryman Yury Sisikin the runner-up; they were the nation's first medals in the event. The Soviets nearly swept the medals, with Mark Midler advancing to a three-man barrage for third place before finishing in fifth place. Albie Axelrod's bronze put the United States on the podium for the event for the first time since 1932. Traditional powers Italy and France, who between them had won 11 of 12 gold medals and 9 of 12 silver, were kept off the podium entirely (and Italy did not even have a fencer made the final).

Background

This was the 13th appearance of the event, which has been held at every Summer Olympics except 1908 (when there was a foil display only rather than a medal event). Three of the eight finalists from 1956 returned: two-time gold medalist (and 1948 silver medalist) Christian d'Oriola of France, fourth-place finisher Allan Jay of Great Britain, and seventh-place finisher Mark Midler of the Soviet Union. D'Oriola was a strong contender for a third gold medal, but the Italian and French hegemony in the event was threatened by rising strength of other nations. Jay was the reigning world champion. The Soviets had won the team event at the world championships.

Monaco, Morocco, New Zealand, Tunisia, and Vietnam each made their debut in the men's foil. The United States made its 12th appearance, most of any nation, having missed only the inaugural 1896 competition.

Competition format 

The competition used a pool play format, with each fencer facing the other fencers in the pool in a round robin. Bouts were to 5 touches. It is unclear how ties were broken in the first round; beginning in round 2, barrages were used to break ties necessary for advancement. However, only as much fencing was done as was necessary to determine advancement, so some bouts never occurred if the fencers advancing from the pool could be determined. The competition involved 5 rounds:

 Round 1: 12 pools, 6 or 7 fencers to a pool (one pool had 5 due to a withdrawal), top 3 advance (total 36 advancing)
 Round 2: 6 pools, 6 fencers to a pool, top 4 advance (total 24 advancing)
 Quarterfinals: 4 pools, 6 fencers to a pool, top 3 advance (total 12 advancing)
 Semifinals: 2 pools, 6 fencers to a pool, top 4 advance (total 8 advancing)
 Final: 1 pool, 8 fencers

Schedule

All times are Central European Time (UTC+1)

Results

Round 1

The top three fencers in each pool advanced.

Round 1 Pool A

Round 1 Pool B

Round 1 Pool C

Round 1 Pool D

Round 1 Pool E

Round 1 Pool F

Round 1 Pool G

Round 1 Pool H

Round 1 Pool I

Saev of Bulgaria did not start, leaving this pool with only 5 fencers.

Round 1 Pool J

Round 1 Pool K

Round 1 Pool L

Round 2

Round 2 Pool A 

The fifth (final) round of the pool was cancelled entirely, as it was clear who the four advancing would be; each fencer thus faced only 4 others.

Round 2 Pool B

Round 2 Pool C

Round 2 Pool D

Round 2 Pool E

Round 2 Pool F 

There was a 4-way tie for 3rd place, requiring a barrage for the last two advancement places.

 Barrage

Quarterfinals

Quarterfinal A 
There was a four-way tie for 3rd place; a barrage was held to determine the final advancing fencer.

 Barrage

Quarterfinal B 
Carpaneda and d'Oriola tied for the 3rd and final advancement place at 3–2, so fenced off for the spot. Carpaneda had won the initial round-robin bout, but d'Oriola won the fence-off and advanced.

 Barrage

Quarterfinal C

Quarterfinal D 
With a three-way tie for 2nd place, a barrage was needed to determine two advancement spots.

 Barrage

Semifinals

Semifinal A 

In a very closely contested semifinal, each fencer finished either 3–2 or 2–3. With a three-way tie for 4th place, a barrage was needed to determine the final advancement spot.

 Barrage

Semifinal B 

Hoskyns and Różycki tied for 4th at 2–3. In the barrage, Hoskyns was victorious, repeating his 5–1 win over Różycki in the round-robin.

 Barrage

Final 

After a 3–2 record in the semifinals, Zhdanovich swept the entire field in the final and finished 7–0 for the gold medal. The next closest fencer and thus silver medalist, Sisikin, went 4–2. Closset dislocated his right knee and was unable to finish the round; his bouts against Sisikin, Axelrod, and Woyda were cancelled. The three men tied for third place at 3 wins (regardless of losses, which were different due to Closset's injury) faced off in a barrage for the bronze medal; Axelrod won by beating both of the other hopefuls. Despite only competing in four bouts, Closset finished in a tie for 6th at 2 wins (he was 2–2 in his bouts), winning the tie-breaker against Hoskyns (2–5) based on touches received in their respective victories: Closset's wins were both by 5–3 scores, for a total of 6 touches received, while Hoskyns's wins were by 5–4 scores, with a total of 8 touches received).

 Barrage

Overall standings

References

Foil men
Men's events at the 1960 Summer Olympics